Mao Mao may refer to:

 Blue mao mao, a species of sea chub
 Mao Mao (director), director of 2012 Chinese film Here Then
 Mao Mao: Heroes of Pure Heart, an American animated television series
 Mao Mao Uprising, a Kenyan uprising